Urophora jaculata is a species of tephritid or fruit flies in the genus Urophora of the family Tephritidae.

Distribution
Europe, Turkey, Caucasus.

References

Urophora
Diptera of Europe
Insects described in 1870
Taxa named by Camillo Rondani